Bad Bodenteich (Eastphalian: Bonndiek) is a municipality in the district of Uelzen, in Lower Saxony, Germany. It is situated approximately 17 km southeast of Uelzen.

Bad Bodenteich was the seat of the former Samtgemeinde ("collective municipality") Bodenteich.

References

Uelzen (district)
Spa towns in Germany